Pseudotalopia fernandrikae is a species of sea snail, a marine gastropod mollusk in the family Trochidae, the top snails.

Description
The size of the shell varies between 8 mm and 18 mm.

Distribution
This marine species occurs off the Philippines.

References

 Poppe G.T., Tagaro S.P. & Dekker H. (2006) The Seguenziidae, Chilodontidae, Trochidae, Calliostomatidae and Solariellidae of the Philippine Islands. Visaya Supplement 2: 1-228.

External links
 
  Vilvens, C. (2005). Description of Pseudotalopia fernandrikae n. sp. (Gastropoda: Trochidae) from the Philippines. Venus. 63 (3-4): 95-100

fernandrikae
Gastropods described in 2005